Ariel Gerardo Nahuelpán Osten (born October 15, 1987), commonly known as Ariel Nahuelpán, is an Argentine professional footballer who plays as a striker for Liga MX club Mazatlán.

Career
Born in Ciudad Evita, Ariel Nahuelpán came from a working-class background. Nahuelpán had to leave football momentarily to work with his father as a bricklayer to help his family economically. Nevertheless, he returned to football and started his career in 2006, at Nueva Chicago, playing 42 Primera B Nacional Argentina games and scoring nine goals.

Coritiba
Ariel left Nueva Chicago in 2008, joining Brazilian club Coritiba for $1.3 million, The Argentine player scored three goals in the 12 Série A games he played for the club in 2008. He left Coritiba when his contract ended in June 2010.

Racing Santander
He signed for Racing de Santander on a free transfer on 13 August 2010 to play at El Sardinero for the 2010-11 La Liga season.

LDU Quito
On 27 January 2012 Nahuelpán signed for LDU Quito as the most expensive signing in Ecuador's Serie A history.

Barcelona SC
On 18 January 2013, the player was loaned to Barcelona SC of Guayaquil. On February 8, he marked his first goal with his new team. In his most notable game, he scored 2 goals against Emelec in the Clasico del Astillero.

UNAM Pumas
In mid-2013, he was sold UNAM Pumas in an amount close to $5 million.

Internacional
On 24 June 2016 Ariel signed with Brazilian club Internacional.

Barcelona Sporting Club 
On 9 March 2017, Vice-president of Barcelona Sporting Club confirmed the contract with Ariel.

Personal life
He is of Chilean descent due to the fact that his father was born in Villarrica, Chile. Also, from his paternal line, he is of Mapuche descent. In December 2021, he acquired the Chilean nationality by blood relationship.

Honours
Pachuca
 Liga MX: Clausura 2016

References

External links
 
 
 
 
 
 
 

1987 births
Living people
Sportspeople from Buenos Aires Province
Argentine footballers
Chilean footballers
Citizens of Chile through descent
Naturalized citizens of Chile
Association football forwards
Nueva Chicago footballers
Coritiba Foot Ball Club players
Racing de Santander players
L.D.U. Quito footballers
Barcelona S.C. footballers
Club Universidad Nacional footballers
C.F. Pachuca players
Club Atlético Tigre footballers
Sport Club Internacional players
Club Tijuana footballers
Querétaro F.C. footballers
Peñarol players
Argentine Primera División players
Campeonato Brasileiro Série A players
Campeonato Brasileiro Série B players
La Liga players
Ecuadorian Serie A players
Liga MX players
Uruguayan Primera División players
Argentine expatriate footballers
Chilean expatriate footballers
Expatriate footballers in Brazil
Expatriate footballers in Spain
Expatriate footballers in Ecuador
Expatriate footballers in Mexico
Expatriate footballers in Uruguay
Argentine expatriate sportspeople in Brazil
Argentine expatriate sportspeople in Spain
Argentine expatriate sportspeople in Ecuador
Argentine expatriate sportspeople in Mexico
Chilean expatriate sportspeople in Mexico 
Argentine expatriate sportspeople in Uruguay
Naturalized citizens of Mexico
Argentine sportspeople of Chilean descent
Argentine people of Mapuche descent
Chilean people of Mapuche descent
Mexican people of Chilean descent
Mexican people of Argentine descent
Sportspeople of Argentine descent
Mapuche sportspeople
Indigenous sportspeople of the Americas